Ram Sewak Hazari (1936 – 27 October 2012) was an Indian politician. He was elected to the Lok Sabha, the lower house of the Parliament of India from Rosera, Bihar as a member of the Janata Party.

References

External links
Official biographical sketch on the Parliament of India website
Ram Sewak Hazari's obituary

Janata Party politicians
Lok Sabha members from Bihar
India MPs 1980–1984
1936 births
2012 deaths
Samata Party politicians
Lok Janshakti Party politicians
Janata Dal (United) politicians
Janata Dal politicians
Samyukta Socialist Party politicians